Broad Street United Methodist Church is a historic Methodist church in Downtown Columbus, Ohio. This church is one of five on East Broad Street built around the year 1900.

It was built in 1885 and added to the National Register of Historic Places in 1980. The church was designed by Yost & Packard with green serpentine stone. This stone was replaced by Rogers Krajnak Architects with synthetic stone that preserved the original green color.

Broad Street United Methodist Church was the site of the 2016 wedding of openly gay pastor David Meredith and Jim Schlachter.

See also
 National Register of Historic Places listings in Columbus, Ohio

References

External links
 

United Methodist churches in Ohio
Churches on the National Register of Historic Places in Ohio
National Register of Historic Places in Columbus, Ohio
Gothic Revival church buildings in Ohio
Churches completed in 1885
Churches in Columbus, Ohio
Akron Plan church buildings
Buildings in downtown Columbus, Ohio
Columbus Register properties
Yost and Packard buildings
Broad Street (Columbus, Ohio)